Countess Maritza (German: Gräfin Mariza) is a 1925 German silent film directed by Hans Steinhoff and starring Vivian Gibson, Harry Liedtke and Colette Brettel. It is an adaptation of the operetta of the same title.

The film's art direction was by Julius von Borsody.

Cast
 Vivian Gibson as Gräfin Maritza  
 Harry Liedtke as Graf Tassilo  
 Colette Brettel as Lisa  
 Fritz Spira as Graf von Wittenburg  
 Robert Garrison as Fürst Moritz Dragomir Populescu  
 Ernő Verebes as Baron Koloman Zsupan  
 Hedwig Pauly-Winterstein as Elvira Pranticzek  
 Wilhelm Diegelmann as Penizek  
 Emil Heyse as Dr. Tarrasch  
 Siegfried Berisch as Mendel Popper  
 Carl Geppert as Freier

References

Bibliography
 Grange, William. Cultural Chronicle of the Weimar Republic. Scarecrow Press, 2008.

External links

1925 films
Films of the Weimar Republic
Films directed by Hans Steinhoff
German silent feature films
Films based on operettas
Terra Film films
German black-and-white films